Kérouané is a prefecture located in the Kankan Region of Guinea. The capital is Kérouané. The prefecture covers an area of 7,020 km.² and has a population of 207,547.

Sub-prefectures
The prefecture is divided administratively into 8 sub-prefectures:
 Kérouané-Centre
 Banankoro
 Damaro
 Komodou
 Kounsankoro
 Linko
 Sibiribaro
 Soromaya

Prefectures of Guinea
Kankan Region